The Expenditure and Food Survey is now the Living Costs and Food Survey.

The Expenditure and Food Survey (EFS) is a survey conducted by the Office for National Statistics (ONS) and the Department for Environment, Food and Rural Affairs (DEFRA) which collects data about private household expenditure and food consumption in Great Britain.

History 
From 1957 until 2001, there were two different surveys conducted each year: the Family Expenditure Survey (FES) and the National Food Survey (NFS). These two surveys were combined in the Expenditure and Food Survey (EFS) which completely replaced the former series. The survey is conducted by the Office for National Statistics (ONS), the DEFRA sponsors the food data. 

The design of the survey is based on that of the FES but there have been some changes, notably with the introduction of the European Standard Classification of Individual Consumption by Purpose (COICOP). Another change has occurred with the use of a new processing software, SPSS, which has affected the structure of the datasets. 

Additionally, the EFS has changed from a financial year based system to a calendar year based one in 2006; from January 2008, the EFS became known as the Living Costs and Food (LCF) module of the Integrated Household Survey (IHS).

Methodology and scope 
The survey is made up of a comprehensive household questionnaire, an individual questionnaire for each adult over 16 years of age, a personal expenditure diary kept by each person over a period of two weeks as well as a simplified diary kept by children aged seven to 15.

Survey results 
The data collected in the EFS is multi-purpose but it is primarily used for the Retail Prices Index, National Accounts estimates of household expenditure, the analysis of the effect of taxes and benefits and trends in nutrition.

Data access 
Data from the Living Costs and Food Survey (2008 to present), as well as the Expenditure and Food Survey (2001 to 2007) can be downloaded for research and teaching use from the UK Data Service website.

References

External links 
 ONS website retrieved 8 November 2013
 DEFRA website retrieved 8 November 2013

Demographics of the United Kingdom
Expenditure
Household surveys
Office for National Statistics
Publications established in 2001